The Bastard may refer to:

 The Bastard (1954 film), a 1954 Argentine film directed by Lucas Demare
 The Bastard (1963 film), a 1963 film by Seijun Suzuki
 The Bastard (1978 film), a 1978 film based on the John Jakes novel
 The Bastard (miniseries), a 1978 made-for-television film based on the John Jakes novel
 The Bastard, a 1971 album by BZN
 The Bastard (album), a 2001 album by Hammers of Misfortune
 The Bastard (novel), a 1974 novel by John Jakes
 "The Bastard", a character in Shakespeare's play King John
 Pac (wrestler) (born Benjamin Satterley, 1986), known as "The Bastard"

See also
 Bastard (disambiguation)
 John the Bastard (disambiguation)